Gabon competed in the Olympic Games for the first time at the 1972 Summer Olympics in Munich, West Germany from August 26, 1972 to September 11, 1972. They sent one athlete, Joseph Mbouroukounda, who competed in boxing in the Men's Featherweight category.

Boxing

Men

References
Official Olympic Reports

Nations at the 1972 Summer Olympics
1972
1972 in Gabon